Ahmed Al-Abbar is a member of the Libyan National Transitional Council in charge of Economics. In this capacity, he is in charge of administering the Council's funds and opening lines of credit from other nations. He resides in Benghazi and runs a company that imports agricultural goods, through which his family has business ties to some in the Senussi.

References

Living people
Members of the National Transitional Council
Libyan businesspeople
People from Benghazi
Year of birth missing (living people)